Kirill Dyakov (born 21 May 1993) is a Russian professional ice hockey defenceman who is currently playing for MHk 32 Liptovský Mikuláš of the Slovak Extraliga.

Playing career
Dyakov was drafted by HC Ugra in the 2nd round, 47th overall, in the 2010 KHL Junior Draft, and made his Kontinental Hockey League debut playing with HC Ugra during the 2011–12 KHL season.

Dyakov returned to his original club HC Ugra on June 22, 2015, after a whirlwind 2014–15 season in the KHL with Torpedo Nizhny Novgorod, HC Neftekhimik Nizhnekamsk and HC Lada Togliatti.

Career statistics

International

References

External links

1993 births
Living people
Admiral Vladivostok players
HC Lada Togliatti players
Metallurg Novokuznetsk players
HC Neftekhimik Nizhnekamsk players
Torpedo Nizhny Novgorod players
HC Yugra players
People from Nizhny Tagil
Russian ice hockey defencemen
Yermak Angarsk players
Yunost Minsk players
HKM Zvolen players
Sportspeople from Sverdlovsk Oblast
MHk 32 Liptovský Mikuláš players
Russian expatriate sportspeople in Belarus
Russian expatriate sportspeople in Slovakia
Expatriate ice hockey players in Belarus
Expatriate ice hockey players in Slovakia
Russian expatriate ice hockey people